Privolye is a rural locality (a village) in Navlinsky District, Bryansk Oblast, Russia. The population was 368 as of 2010. There are 3 streets.

Geography 
Privolye is located 24 km north of Navlya (the district's administrative centre) by road. Chichkovo is the nearest rural locality.

References 

Rural localities in Navlinsky District